The official public holidays in Bulgaria are listed in the table below.

Other Observances 
 1 March - Baba Marta Day - Баба Марта
 8 March - International Women's Day - Ден на жената
 8 March -  Mother's Day - Ден на майката
 6 May - Armed Forces Day - Ден на въоръжените сили St. George's Day

Former national holidays
 9 September - Day of the People's Uprising of 9 September (Ден на народното въстание на 9 септември) was celebrated in the People's Republic of Bulgaria until 1989.
 7 November - October Revolution Day (Ден на октомврийската революция)

References 

 
Bulgaria
Holidays